Collaboration is a process where two or more people or organizations work together to realise shared goals.

Collaboration(s) may also refer to:
 Collaborative editing
 Collaborative writing
 Collaboration (magazine), a magazine dedicated to the spiritual and evolutionary vision of Sri Aurobindo and The Mother
 Collaboration: Japanese Agents and Local Elites in Wartime China
 Collaborative software, applications or services that facilitate collaboration between users, mostly on the internet
 The Collaboration (TV series), a 2016 Chinese and South Korean collaboration television program
 The Collaboration: Hollywood's Pact with Hitler

Music
The Collaboration (music group), a dance music project, 1999–2001
Collaboration (Shorty Rogers and André Previn album), 1955
 Collaboration (Modern Jazz Quartet and Laurindo Almeida album), 1964
 Collaboration, an album by Shawn Phillips, 1971
 Collaboration (George Benson & Earl Klugh album), 1987
 Collaboration (Helen Merrill and Gil Evans album), 1987
 Collaboration (Tommy Emmanuel album), 1998
 Collaborations (KJ-52 album), a 2002 album by KJ-52
 Collaborations (Space Tribe album), 2004
 Collaborations (Sinéad O'Connor album), a 2005 album by Sinéad O'Connor
 Collaborations (Jill Scott album), a 2007 album by Jill Scott
 Collaborations (Marilyn Crispell album), 2009
 Collaborations 2, by Punjabi singer Sukshinder Shinda, 2009
 Collaborations (Ravi Shankar and George Harrison album), 2010

Politics and war
 Collaboration with the Axis Powers
 Collaborationism

See also
Cross-promotion, a collaboration between products or services